Ibrahima Sanoh (born 11 April 1994) is a Guinean professional footballer who plays as a striker.

Early life
Sanoh was born in Conakry, Guinea.

Club career

Early career
In 2014, Sanoh played for PEI club Sherwood Bayern. That fall, he began attending Holland College in Charlottetown, where he went on to score 101 goals in 70 appearances over five years for the school soccer team.

In January 2018, Sanoh spent time on trial with Toronto FC II. In 2019, he played for New Brunswick Premier Soccer League side PEI FC, scoring nine goals.

HFX Wanderers
On 3 December 2019, Sanoh signed his first professional contract with Canadian Premier League side HFX Wanderers shortly after acquiring  permanent resident status in Prince Edward Island, and thereby counting as a domestic player in the league. He made his professional debut with the Wanderers on August 15 as a substitute against Pacific FC and scored a penalty in a 2-2- draw.

Honours
HFX Wanderers
 Canadian Premier League
Runners-up: 2020

References

External links

1994 births
Living people
Association football forwards
Guinean footballers
Sportspeople from Conakry
Guinean expatriate footballers
Expatriate soccer players in Canada
Guinean expatriate sportspeople in Canada
HFX Wanderers FC players
Canadian Premier League players